Bustan Ketab Publishing is an Iranian publisher established by Qom hawza.

Overview 

Bustan Ketab Publishing was established in 1982. Since then Bustan Ketab has published many titles in  Islam.

References

External links
[www.http://bustaneketab.com]

Book publishing companies of Iran
Publishing companies established in 1982
1982 establishments in Iran